Gordan Mohor (born in 1964 in Zagreb) is a Croatian retired footballer.

Career
As a product of Dinamo Zagreb youth team, he signed the contract for his hometown club at the age of 18. But, since he had big, more experienced competition (Vlak, Stojić, Ladić) he played mostly in friendly matches. So, after being previously loaned to Zagreb, he left the club and went to play for BSK and Iskra Bugojno. While playing for the latter one, he earned maximum grade for his performance in cup match against Partizan Belgrade.  After a season in Bugojno, he moved to Ljubljana to play for Olimpija. With that club he managed to achieve promotion to first Yugoslav league. He finished his career playing for Studio D Novo Mesto in newly formed Slovenian league. After hanging up the boots, he went into wine distribution business.

References

1964 births
Living people
Footballers from Zagreb
Association football goalkeepers
Yugoslav footballers
Croatian footballers
GNK Dinamo Zagreb players
NK Zagreb players
NK Marsonia players
NK Iskra Bugojno players
NK Olimpija Ljubljana (1945–2005) players
NK Krka players
Yugoslav First League players
Slovenian PrvaLiga players
Croatian expatriate footballers
Expatriate footballers in Slovenia
Croatian expatriate sportspeople in Slovenia